Mochica (also Yunga, Yunca, Chimú, Muchic, Mochika, Muchik, Chimu) is an extinct language formerly spoken along the northwest coast of Peru and in an inland village. First documented in 1607, the language was widely spoken in the area during the 17th century and the early 18th century. By the late 19th century, the language was dying out and spoken only by a few people in the village of Etén, in Chiclayo. It died out as a spoken language around 1920, but certain words and phrases continued to be used until the 1960s.

It is best known as the supposed language of the Moche culture, as well as the Chimú culture/Chimor.

Classification
Mochica is usually considered to be a language isolate, but has also been hypothesized as belonging to a wider Chimuan language family. Stark (1972) proposes a connection with Uru–Chipaya as part of a Maya–Yunga–Chipayan macrofamily hypothesis.

Language contact
Jolkesky (2016) notes that there are lexical similarities with the Trumai, Arawak, Kandoshi, Muniche, Barbakoa, Cholon-Hibito, Kechua, Mapudungun, Kanichana, and Kunza language families due to contact. Jolkesky (2016) also suggests that similarities with Amazonian languages may be due to the early migration of Mochica speakers down the Marañón and Solimões.

Varieties
"Southern Chimú" varieties listed by Loukotka (1968) are given below.

Chimú - around Trujillo, Peru
Eten - Loukotka (1968) reported a few speakers in the villages of Eten and Monsefú, department of Lambayeque
Mochica - once spoken on the coast of the department of Libertad
Casma - once spoken on the Casma River, department of Ancash (unattested)
Paramonga - once spoken on the Fortaleza River, department of Ancash (unattested)

Typology
Mochica is typologically different from the other main languages on the west coast of South America, namely the Quechuan languages, Aymara, and the Mapuche language. Further, it contains rare features such as:
 a case system in which cases are built on each other in a linear sequence; for example, the ablative case suffix is added to the locative case, which in turn is added to an oblique case form;
 all nouns have two stems, possessed and non-possessed;
 an agentive case suffix used mainly for the agent in passive clauses; and
 a verbal system in which all finite forms are formed with the copula.

Phonology
The reconstruction or recovery of the Mochican sounds is problematic. Different scholars who worked with the language used different notations. Both Carrera Daza like Middendorf, devoted much space to justify the phonetic value of the signs they used, but neither was completely successful in clearing the doubts of interpretation of these symbols. In fact their interpretations differ markedly, casting doubt on some sounds.

Lehman made a useful comparison of existing sources, enriched with observations of 1929. The long-awaited field notes of Brüning from 1904 to 1905 have been kept in the Museum of Ethnology, Hamburg, though still unpublished. An additional complication in spellings interpretation of different scholars is the fact that between the 16th and the 19th century the language experienced a remarkable phonological change that make even more risky to use the latest data to understand older material.

Vowels
The language probably had six simple vowels and six more elongated vowels: /i, iː, ä, äː, e, eː, ø, øː, o, oː, u, uː/. Carrera Daza and  Middendorf gave mismatched systems that can be put in approximate correspondence:

Morphology
Some suffixes in Mochica as reconstituted by Hovdhaugen (2004):
sequential suffix: -top
purpose suffix: -næm
gerund suffixes: -læc and -ssæc
gerund suffix: -(æ)zcæf
gerund suffix: -(æ)d

Lexicon
Some examples of lexical items in Mochica from Hovdhaugen (2004):

Nouns
Possessed and non-possessed nouns in Mochica:

Locative forms of Mochica nouns:

Quantifiers
Quantifiers in Mochica:

Numerals
Mochica numerals:

Surviving records
The only surviving song in the language is a single tonada, Tonada del Chimo, preserved in the Codex Martínez Compañón among many watercolours illustrating the life of Chimú people during the 18th century:
Ja ya llunch, ja ya lloch
In poc cha tanmuisle pecan
muisle pecan e necam

Ja ya llunch, ja ya lloch

Emenspochifama le qui
ten que consmuifle Cuerpo lens
emens locunmunom chi perdonar moitin ha

Ja ya llunch, ja ya lloch

Chondocolo mechecje su chrifto
po que si ta malli muis le Mey po lem
lo quees aoscho perdonar
Mie ñe fe che tas

Ja ya llunch, ja ya lloch

Quingnam, possibly the same as Lengua (Yunga) Pescadora, is sometimes taken to be a dialect, but a list of numerals discovered in 2010 which is suspected to be Quingnam or Pescadora is not Mochica.

Learning program
The Gestión de Cultura of Morrope in Peru has launched a program to learn this language, in order to preserve the ancient cultural heritage in the area. This program has been well received by people and adopted by many schools, and also have launched other activities such as the development of ceramics, mates, etc.

Further reading
Brüning, Hans Heinrich (2004). Mochica Wörterbuch / Diccionario mochica: Mochica-castellano, castellano-mochica. Lima: Universidad San Martín de Porres.
Hovdhaugen, Even (2004). Mochica. Munich: LINCOM Europa.
Schumacher de Peña, G. (1992). El vocabulario mochica de Walter Lehmann (1929) comparado con otras fuentes léxicas. Lima: UNSM, Instituto de Investigación de Lingüística Aplicada.

References

External links

Abstract of Mochica from the Languages of the World series

Chimuan languages
Extinct languages of South America
Language isolates of South America